The Arancia-class inshore rescue craft is a class of small inflatable rescue boat (IRB) operated by, among others, Surf Life Saving Great Britain, Surf Life Saving Association of Wales and the Royal National Lifeboat Institution (RNLI) of the United Kingdom and Ireland.

The Arancia inshore rescue craft originates from New Zealand where it is made by Arancia Industries Ltd. The Arancia surf rescue craft is also used in Surf Rescue competitions to demonstrate the high speed rescue skills of boat crews around the world. When in use it carries up to two crew and is primarily used for surf lifesaving duties.

Other small boats operated by the RNLI include the X-class lifeboat, XP-class lifeboat and Y-class lifeboat. The RNLI have placed Arancias at lifeboat stations to supplement Atlantic 85s. Two stations in Wales, Aberystwyth and Criccieth, now have these as permanent resources after a trial period.

References

External links 
RNLI Fleet
RNLI Beach Lifeguards - RNLI Beach Rescue
Arancia Industries - The manufacturer of the Arancia Inflatables
Surf Life Saving Great Britain Britains Surf Life Saving Organisation

Royal National Lifeboat Institution lifeboats
Inflatable boats